Thelesperma pubescens is a species of flowering plants in the aster family known by the common names hairy greenthread and Uinta greenthread. It is native to Wyoming and Utah in the United States. This species was first described in 1983.

This species is a perennial herb growing from a woody taproot and branching caudex unit covered in the dried remnants of previous seasons' leaves. The stems grow up to about 12 centimeters tall. They are mostly leafless, the leaves located mainly around the base of the plant. The leaves are up to 5 centimeters long. Most are divided into narrow leaflets. They are coated in short hairs, a distinguishing feature. There are flower heads containing yellow disc florets streaked with reddish veins, and no ray florets. The fruit is an achene. Blooming occurs in July and August.

This plant is restricted to the Bishop Conglomerate, a geological formation. It grows on cobbly soils in the harsh, windy conditions on exposed mountain slopes. In Wyoming it is limited to the north slopes of the Uinta Mountains, where there are four occurrences.

Threats to the species include road development, which cuts through the habitat and also facilitates the spread of introduced species of plants such as Bromus tectorum. Oil and gas development activity may pose a slight threat, mainly via the construction of roads and pipelines.

References

Coreopsideae
Flora of Utah
Flora of Wyoming
Plants described in 1983